Valentina Igoshina (born 4 November 1978 in Bryansk, Bryansk Oblast) is a Russian classical pianist.  She has won several international piano competitions.

Biography
Valentina Igoshina began studying piano with her mother, and first took lessons at home at the age of four. At the age of twelve she began attending the Moscow Central School of Music for gifted students and became a pupil of Sergei Dorensky and Larissa Dedova at the Moscow Tchaikovsky Conservatory.

Igoshina has also served as a teacher of piano at the Moscow Tchaikovsky Conservatory in Moscow. Currently she is a professor at the Royal Conservatory of Brussels and at the Conservatoire Maurice Ravel in Paris. She has lived in France for the past two decades, and  travels extensively for concerts and recitals.

Professional accomplishments

In 1993, at age 14, she won first prize at the Arthur Rubinstein Piano Competition in Bydgoszcz, Poland. In 1997, at age 18, she won first prize and a special award at the famed Rachmaninov International Piano Competition in Moscow. In 2000, she was given an honorable mention at the XIV International Chopin Piano Competition.

Igoshina has also competed in four other worldwide piano competitions:
Second place at the Atlanta International Piano Competition (2002), Georgia

First place at the Concorso Pianistico Internazionale "Premio Giuliano Pecar" (2002), Italy
Laureate at the Queen Elisabeth Competition in Brussels, (2003)  
Second place at the José Iturbi International Piano Competition (2006), Valencia, Spain

Igoshina appears on the list of great women pianists as compiled at forte-piano-pianissimo.com.

Festival and major orchestral appearances

Igoshina has been invited to play with many notable orchestras, among them:
Royal Concertgebouw Orchestra in Amsterdam, Markus Stenz conducting 
BBC Scottish Symphony Orchestra in Aberdeen, Alexander Titov conducting
Hallé Orchestra in Manchester, United Kingdom, Sir Mark Elder conducting
Melbourne Symphony Orchestra in Australia, Markus Stenz conducting
Orquestra Simfònica de Barcelona ì Nacional de Catalunya, Josep Caballé Domenech conducting
Orquesta Filarmónica de Santiago in Chile, Jan Latham-Koenig conducting
London Philharmonic, Carl Davis conducting
Macao Orchestra in Macao, China, Lü Jia conducting
Warsaw Philharmonic Orchestra, Antoni Wit conducting
Orquestra Sinfônica Municipal de São Paulo, Josè Maria Florêncio conducting
Real Filharmonia de Galicia, Antoni Ros-Marba conducting
Orchestre Royal de Chambre de Wallonie, Augustin Dumay conducting
Brandenburg Symphony Orchestra, Takao Ukigaya conducting
Polish National Radio Symphony Orchestra, Michal Klauza conducting

Igoshina has appeared on multiple occasions with several of the foregoing orchestras.  Additionally, she worked both in Russia and Italy with Alexander Vedernikov during his tenure at the Bolshoi Theatre.  She has performed in the Great Hall of Moscow Conservatory. Igoshina has also appeared with orchestras in Kraków, Poland; Sacramento, California; Gdansk, Poland; St. Louis, Missouri (Robert Hart Baker conducting); Saint-Etienne, France; Tokyo, Japan; Moscow, St Petersburg, and Bryansk in Russia; Sofia, Bulgaria; Budapest, Hungary (Izaki Masahiro conducting); and many other venues. She has often served as a judge of piano competitions at venues throughout Europe and elsewhere.

She has also participated in numerous recitals and musical festivals; a few are listed as follows:

Tonhalle, Zurich
La Società dei Concerti, Milan
Ravello Festival, Italy
Duszniki Zdroj Chopin Festival, Poland
Belem Festival, Lisbon
Radio France-Montpellier, France
Festival de La Roque-d'Anthéron, Provence, France
Harrod's International Piano Series, Queen Elizabeth Hall, London
Styriarte, Graz, Austria
Povoa de Varzim Festival, Portugal
Association "Musique au Pays de George Sand", Nohant-Vic, France
Nuits Musicales d'Uzès, Uzès, France
Ohrid Summer Festival, Macedonia
Théâtre de l'Athénée, Paris
Piano-en-Valois Festival, Angoulême, France
Cercle de l'Union interalliee, Paris
Théâtre du Châtelet, Paris 
Piano aux Jacobins Festival International, Toulouse
Polish Baltic Philharmonic Hall, Gdansk 
Mons, Belgium with Augustin Dumay
St. Louis, Missouri with violinists Michael Ludwig and David Halen
Les Musicales de l'Eure Festival, Pacy-sur-Eure, France 
 Auditorium du Conservatoire Maurice Ravel, Paris
Vaud, Switzerland and Gagnac-sur-Cère, France with cellist Mark Drobinsky
Tokyo Bunka Kaikan Hall, Tokyo, Japan with flutist Junko Ukigaya
Académie Internationale d'été de Nice, France
Chandigarh, India, Taj Palace Hall, featuring Tchaikovsky music
Ann Arbor, Michigan, Recital at the University of Michigan

Recordings
Igoshina has made live recordings on BBC Radio 3, ABC Classic FM, and BBC Scotland, as well as the sound tracks for Tony Palmer's movies The Harvest of Sorrow (also working on the project were Valery Gergiev and Mikhail Pletnev) and The Strange Case of Delphina Potocka. She played one of the leading roles in the latter film.

In 2006 Warner Classics International produced an album entitled Valentina Igoshina, wherein she played works by Modest Mussorgsky and Robert Schumann. Included on the album were Mussorgsky's Pictures at an Exhibition and Schumann's Carnaval.

In 2008 Igoshina recorded a work of the waltzes of Frédéric Chopin. The album, entitled Chopin: Complete Waltzes was chosen by Classic FM Magazine as its November 2008 "Disc of the Month". It was produced by Lontano Music and distributed by Warner Classics International.

In October 2010 Igoshina recorded Dmitri Shostakovich's First and Second Piano Concertos with the Deutsche Kammerakademie Neuss-am-Rhein (near Düsseldorf), and the work is distributed by Warner Classics International.  Also in 2010, she appeared in another of Tony Palmer's productions, entitled Valentina Igoshina Plays Chopin. A review by the Los Angeles Times stated, "After this you will never be able to hear the music of Chopin in the same way again."

In 2013 RS Real Sound Productions' 'EXcellence' Series recorded Igoshina playing "Corelli Variations" and "Preludes" by Sergei Rachmaninov and Frédéric Chopin respectively.

In 2018 Antes Edition released Kammermusik für Flöte und Klavier with Igoshina and Junko Ukigaya, which featured music of Antonín Dvořák, Sergei Prokofiev and César Franck.

Many of Igoshina's performances can be seen on YouTube, including Chopin's Fantaisie Impromptu and Liszt's Liebesträume.  Her performances have exceeded a million views on that medium.  Igoshina speaks fluent English, French and Russian.

References

1978 births
José Iturbi International Piano Competition prize-winners
Living people
Russian classical pianists
Russian women pianists
Women classical pianists
21st-century classical pianists
21st-century women pianists